Okhtyrka is a city located in Sumy Oblast, Ukraine. The city serves as the administrative center of Okhtyrka Raion since 1975. Population: 

Okhtyrka was once home to Hussars and Cossacks. It was also once a regional seat of the Sloboda Ukraine imperial region and of the Ukrainian SSR. Since the discovery of oil and gas in 1961, Okhtyrka has become the "oil capital of Ukraine." It is home to Okhtyrka air base and historical and religious places of interest.

The villages of Velyke Ozero (274 inhabitants), Zaluzhany (28 inhabitants), Prystan (7 inhabitants), and Koziatyn (6 inhabitants) belong to the Okhtyrka city administration which is designated into a separate subdivision of the Sumy Oblast.

Some of its religious buildings were almost destroyed in the 2022 Russian invasion of Ukraine.

Name
According to the most probable etymology, Okhtyrka is named for the river by the same name on whose banks it is located. 

According to some local historians, the river's name in translation from the Turkic language means "lazy river". In the opinion of others, the city's name from the same Turkic language is translated as the "place of ambush," or "white fort". Russian philologist Oleg Trubachyov considered that there are no serious grounds to accept the Turkic etymology and that the river's name is "insufficiently clear in origin."

Linguist Kostiantyn Tyshchenko points to the Gothic origin of the name "Okhtyrka".

Geography and climate
Located south of the Sumy region, Okhtyrka lies in the center of a triangle created by regional centers – Sumy, Kharkiv, and Poltava. The city is on the left bank of the Vorskla River, colloquially known as the blue pearl of Ukrainian rivers.

History and legends
Okhtyrka was first established by former Ruthenians of the Polish–Lithuanian Commonwealth escaping Polonization, moving from the Right-bank Ukraine to Sloboda Ukraine. Next to the new settlement Polish authorities established a border outpost against the Muscovite Belgorod Border Line. The settlement and the outpost (fortress) were founded on the right bank of the Vorskla River on the site of an ancient Ruthenian settlement on Ak-tyr Hill (from Turkic – "white rock") in 1641, by Ukrainian Cossacks led by Polish government official Kulczewski. It was named Akhtyrsk.

In 1647, according to the act of demarcation of borders that drawn by the Treaty of Polyanovka of 1634, it was ceded by the Kingdom of Poland to the Tsardom of Russia. Akhtyrsk became the last southwestern point of the Belgorod defense line that was stretching along the southern border of the Russian state in the middle of the 17th century. In 1650 the Russian authorities reduced the fortress to a mere lookout outpost, next to which soon has appeared the Holy Trinity Monastery.

In 1653 on the banks of the Vorskla tributary Okhtyrka a group of migrants from right-bank Ukraine established a settlement which adopted the name of the outpost. In 1654 a fortification was completed, and in 1655-1656 further expanded by Russian sluzhilie (service members) led by the Tsar's appointed voivodes Larion Kaminin and Trofim Chernov. In 1656 the biggest group of over 1,000 people from right-bank Ukrainearrived, led by Cossack sotnik Arystov and protopope Antoniy from Zhyvotov (possibly the Kiev Voivodeship).

Being bolstered in this prominent position during the 17th and 18th centuries, Okhtyrka rose to rival Kharkiv itself. The first census of the city was taken in 1655 by governor of Okhtyrka, Trofim Khrushchev, listing 1,339 residents. In 1655-1658, the settlement was a regimental town of the Okhtyrka Regiment.

In 1718 a tobacco factory started up, the first one in Ukraine. Throughout the 18th century Okhtyrka transformed into a center of crafts and trade. Following the 1765 liquidation of regimental system of administration, Okhtyrka became a center of the Sloboda Ukraine province and then Okhtyrka uyezd of the Kharkov Governorate.

2022 Russian Invasion 

Clashes have been ongoing in Okhtyrka between the Ukrainian Armed Forces and the invading Russian Armed Forces in the city since 24 February 2022. On the morning of February 25, the city of Оkhtyrka was shelled. According to Amnesty International, Russian troops used cluster munitions, and dropped them on a kindergarten. As a result, three people died, including a child. On this day, in the area of Оkhtyrka, a Russian Grad multiple rocket launcher fired on a bus for the evacuation of residents. Chairman of the Sumy Regional State Administration Dmytro Zhyvytskyi said that five more civilians were killed in the city. On the morning of February 26, explosions were heard in Оkhtyrka, later it became known that Russian Armed Forces completely bombed a military unit, and also fired at the Dachny residential area. According to Zhyvytskyi, more than 70 Ukrainian soldiers died as a result of shelling by Russian troops of a military unit in Оkhtyrka. On February 27, the chairman of the Sumy Regional State Administration reported that Russian tanks had shot a bus with civilians. On February 28, Russian forces used a vacuum bomb on the city. On March 1, the General Staff of the Armed Forces of Ukraine reported that Russian troops were holding the city surrounded. On March 3, Russian aircraft bombarded the local thermal power plant and fired at residential areas of Оkhtyrka. On March 5, the head of the Sumy Regional State Administration announced that the Оkhtyrka Combined Heat and Power Plant was completely destroyed after an air bombardment by Russian aircraft, resulting in the death of 5 workers. On March 8, Оkhtyrka was subjected to another artillery shelling from Russia, residential areas were damaged. On the night of March 10, Russian aircraft bombed Оkhtyrka twice, a bombing attack was carried out on the Kachanovsky GPP of PJSC Ukrnafta. At noon on March 13, as a result of Russian shelling, in Оkhtyrka, along Kyiv street No. 2, the gas station BVS No. 22 was on fire. On the night of March 13–14, Russian aircraft again bombed Оkhtyrka. The city continues to resist the Russian invaders. On March 16, the Russian military began to retreat. On March 20, active hostilities continued in the Оkhtyrka raion.

On March 24, 2022, in order to celebrate the feat, mass heroism and resilience of citizens identified in the defense of their city during the repulse of the armed aggression of the Russian Federation against Ukraine, by Decree of the President of Ukraine No. 164/2022, the city of Оkhtyrka was awarded the honorary distinction "Hero City of Ukraine". 

Russians, using prohibited means of warfare, carried out a powerful air bombardment of the most densely populated residential area of Оkhtyrka, Dachny district. As a result of the bombing, at least 15 residential high-rise and private houses, civil infrastructure facilities, and power lines were destroyed and damaged. According to the Emergency Situations Ministry of Ukraine in Оkhtyrka, rescuers were able to free an injured woman from the rubble of damaged houses and also found the body of one deceased. According to preliminary data, one person died. On March 25, Russian aircraft bombed Оkhtyrka again. On March 30, public utilities in Оkhtyrka began repairing damaged houses.

The coat of arms 
The town's coat of arms (blue field, golden cross and shining sun above) celebrates the city's great number of visiting pilgrims. It was introduced by Simon Bekenshtein on September 21, 1781, and reinstated in 1991 by the city council.

Gallery

Military history

In 1655–1658 the Okhtyrka Cossack Regiment was formed and lasted until 1765, when by order of Catherine II, all Cossack regiments were dismantled. In 1709 the territory of the Cossack regiment became the scene of fierce fighting with the Swedes. More than a hundred years the Cossack regiment had fought against the invasion of the Tatars, and the troops had both defeats and victories over the Turks, Tatars, and the Swedes. Later, Okhtyrka's Cossack regiment reformed into hussars.

Okhtyrka Fortress

Okhtyrka, like all of Sloboda Ukraine, had a chaotic structure of buildings. The central core of the city was represented by the fortress, which occupied a dominant place in the strategic sense. The buildings ran around, fitting into the terrain without any order.

Okhtyrka's fort sat on the shore of the small Okhtyrka river where it makes a loop, forming a natural protection.  The fortress was surrounded by numerous lakes, complicating approaches to it.

The fortress had the shape of an irregular quadrilateral, and occupied the area of the present city center, from the river to the location of today's "Intercession Cathedral" outside the castle. It was surrounded by a wooden fence with five stone and fifteen wooden towers and two bastions. The fortress gates had drawbridges. Around the castle a moat was dug and earth mound built with caponier at the corners. The water filled moat gave the island fortress a situational advantage, strengthening its defense capacity.

In the early 18th century Cossacks of the Okhtyrka regiment took an active part in the Great Northern War, recapturing the Swedish and Russian lands bordering the Baltic Sea. On December 26, 1707, Peter the First himself came to the city to personally verify the readiness of the garrison and hold a council of war.

Hussars

Okhtyrka Hussars played an important role in the fight against Napoleon during the War of 1812. They participated in the battles of Smolensk, Vyazma, and Borodino. For services in battle the regiment was honored to open the parade of victors at the entry of Allied troops in Paris. In this regiment served, as one of the leaders of the partisan movement during the War in 1812, the Russian poet Dmitry Davydov, and the Russian composer Alexander Alyabyev. In 1823, the regiment was commanded by a future Decembrist, A. Muravyev, and Mikhail Lermontov, a Russian poet.

Many people fought and died in WWI and a lot more in WWII. The fighting around Okhtyrka was fearsome and resulted in a prominent common grave of Soviet soldiers in the area.

Soviet times

During World War II, Okhtyrka was occupied by the German Army from 15 October 1941 to 23 February 1943 and again from 11 March to 25 August 1943. The Germans operated a Dulag transit camp for prisoners of war in 1941–1942. Okhtyrka was near the southern flank of the Kursk Bulge, and fighting in the city in the summer of 1943 got extremely fierce. Which is why the city and its surroundings have so many monuments of the last war: the eternal flame of remembrance in the city park, Valley of Heroes, T-34 tank on a pedestal in one of the city's entrances, the Mound of Glory, etc. After the war, a large army garrison was established in the area of Okhtyrka. Military parades in the city, arranged on the occasion of Soviet holidays, could compete with the capital due to the number of participating vehicles and machinery of all kinds.

In the last decade of the Soviet period Okhtyrka was militarized, housing several army regiments. The Dachny precinct became a home to officers' families from all around the former USSR. Many of them served in Eastern Bloc countries (East Germany, Hungary, Czechoslovakia etc.), took part in Vietnam and Afghanistan wars and served as consultants in Cuba. As the USSR started to fall apart, all the machinery and ballistic rockets were transported to Russian territory, however it took a very long time for the regiments to move or to transform. A lot of military personnel or their families stayed in Okhtyrka or still have connections to this city.

Architecture
There are many significant wooden and brick churches in the area.

On "Monastery Hill" overlooking the Vorskla river 4–5 km north of Оkhtyrka stands the Holy Trinity Monastery, established 1654.  These holy grounds have been practically destroyed during the Soviet era with exception of its bell tower that kept a bit of its structure intact. October revolt, World War II and anti-religious policies of Soviet era played a big part here.  It has been reopened following restoration of religious life in Ukraine and Russia, for the 4th time during its uneasy history it enjoys its rebirth.  Mostly surviving on donations and on the work of enthusiastic monks and volunteers, with Kyiv Church blessings, it has started to rebuild its former glory and has become one of the main religious places for Ukrainian and Russian Orthodox Christian worshipers in the region, becoming a notable landmark in Ukraine.

Cathedral and its relics

Okhtyrka was the first city in Ukraine with a tobacco factory. The city has a beautiful Cathedral of the Holy Virgin (1753–62), formerly attributed to Bartolomeo Rastrelli and currently to Dmitry Ukhtomsky with managing architect S. Dudinsky. Its singular architecture is a complex medley of traditional Sloboda Ukrainian Baroque with fashionable elements derived from the imperial capital. The interior is decorated with pilasters with Ionic capitals, and paintings on sails. It suffered during the Great Patriotic War. The restorations began in 1970-1972 but were completed only after collapse of USSR. The construction is unique in its three-dimensional solution and has no analogy in the Ukrainian Baroque architecture. Nearbt stands the Nativity Church (1825), which resembles a palace rather than a church. The cathedral belltower was built in three tiers and adorned with statuary in 1783.

Miraculous icon of Okhtyrka

Iconography of Оkhtyrka icon originates in Italo-Greek art. Usually pictured is a half-length image of the Blessed Virgin Mary with folded hands in supplication, with to her left the Lord Jesus Christ, crucified on the cross.

The Okhtyrka miraculous icon was revealed on July 2, 1739. The image, which emanated radiance, was uncovered by priest Vasily (Basil) Danilov in the grassland of Protection Church while he was mowing and took it home. After three years later, the priest entered the room on the day of the feast of the Protection and was struck by the extraordinary light of the icon. He prayed devoutly near the icon but never said anything to anyone else. Once, the priest saw the Virgin in a dream, and heard her command him to remove dust from it and to clean it with water. On his awakening he executed the command. He left the water that he used to clean the icon in a vessel, planning to take it to the river the next morning to empty and to wash the vessel. Again, he fell asleep and dreamed he was going to the river the next morning. He heard the voice of Mother of God tell him to return home and keep the water, and that it would heal any who suffered from fever.  He had a daughter who had long experienced fevers so when he awoke, he gave her the water to drink, and his daughter soon recovered.

Then the priest asked Ioan (John) the iconographer to repair damaged paint on the icon. Knowing of its miraculous healing qualities, Ioan washed it with water and gave the water to his son, who suffered from fever, who also recovered. While preparing for the restoration that night he heard the icon say: "Get up! Now is the time to return the icon to where you took it. Fix it you cannot." The painter prayed before the icon until morning, and took it back to Basil, who, convinced of its miraculous power, put it in the protection of the Church. Fever sufferers began to pray to the icon and were miraculously healed in great numbers.

The news of the miracles of the icon spread to the Imperial Court. The Mother of God appeared in a vivid dream to the widow Baroness von Veydel, who visited Okhtyrka in 1748. The Lady told her that her days were numbered and ordered her to give away her estate, distributing it to the needy, and promised protection to her two young daughters. The baroness rushed to distribute the property and actually died five days later. The news about this reached the Empress, and Elizabeth took the orphans to the court, raised them and married one to Count Panin, and the other to Count Chernyshov. Both of them made generous contributions to the cathedral, where the icon remained until the day they died.

In 1751 the Holy Synod decided to honor the icon of Okhtyrka as miraculous. In 1753 Empress Elizabeth donated funds and a stone Cathedral of the Holy Virgin was erected where the icon was found. The icon was kept in the Cathedral until its abduction in 1903 during its voyage to St. Petersburg for restoration.

It is unknown how the holy icon found its way to Harbin, but that's where it was acquired by S A Stepanov. According to the Harbin Archpriest Nikolai Trufanova, who repeatedly visited Okhtyrka icon in Okhtyrka it was the very icon that had gone missing. He confirmed that Stepanov acquired that very same wonder-working icon of Okhtyrka. In the 1950s, the son of Stepanov brought it to Brazil and then to San Francisco, where he gave it to the Committee of the Russian Orthodox youth as a blessing. Then Okhtyrka icon was placed under the jurisdiction of Sydney Archbishop Hilarion (Kapral).

Blessed copies of Okhtyrka icon

The icon of Okhtyrka, which is revered as a healer of many diseases, has been copied with blessing of the church in small numbers that were distributed mainly in the south of Russia, in Kharkiv diocese. One such icon from the 18th or 19th century is kept in Moscow, in the main aisle of the church of Resurrection in the Arbat (ap. Philip) Jerusalem monastery. Okhtyrka icon is called "Samara" - the main shrine of Samara Nicholas male monastery.

In 1975, the information that the lost Okhtyrka icon was in San Francisco reached the Soviet Union. In 1995 the Metropolitan Nicodemus of Kharkiv (Rusnak) brought a copy of the icon, and handed it to Okhtyrka St. Basil's Cathedral. In connection with this event a holy procession on the third day after the Holy Trinity with other icons placed the Okhtyrka icon into the Holy Trinity Monastery. These holy processions occurred yearly from 1844 on the Saturday of Pentecost, and later the icons were transferred back on the feast of All Saints. On June 15, 1999 Okhtyrka held celebrations to mark the 260th anniversary of the phenomenon of the miraculous Okhtyrka icon.

List of temples in honor of Okhtyrka icons

Temples in the village Chernetove Bryansk region, Russia; Akhtyrsky nunnery in the village Gusevka Volgograd region, Russia; Church in the village of Akhtyrka Sergiev Posad, Moscow Region, Russia; Chapel at the Republican Hospital in Petrozavodsk; Akhtyrsky Cathedral in City Orel, Russia.

Culture

People who live in Okhtyrka have origins in different nationalities with the mainstream culture being predominantly Ukrainian and Russian, which is widely accepted by all. This is also influenced by Orthodox faith traditions, the surrounding Christian architecture, the religious life and history of this city. In recent years, following the independence of Ukraine there is a noticeable shift to Ukrainian culture. The spoken language is Ukrainian and Russian, or a mixture of both, with Ukrainian language dominating.

Okhtyrkivtsi (residents of Okhtyrka) celebrate the Day of the City on August 25, in honor of liberation of this city on this day in 1943 from Nazi German invaders; Ukrainian independence day; Patronal feast days; Carnival; A festival in honor of the holiday of Ivan Kupala and many other.

Economy

Tobacco
In 1718 the first Russian tobacco manufacture began, which was attributed to several villages (944 peasant households), but proved unprofitable. In 1727 the company sold its treasury to private individuals. The tobacco factory was served by an isolated plantation (50 acres), from which were collected seven thousand pounds of tobacco.

Oil and gas
Since the discovery of oil and gas in 1961 Okhtyrka has become an "oil capital of Ukraine". Okhtyrka region produces the most oil in Ukraine.

Other industries
In the early 20th century there were manufacturers of light woollen stuffs and a trade in corn, cattle and the produce of domestic industries. The area was fertile, and the orchards producing excellent fruit. Obolon CJSC has a brewery in Okhtyrka.

NGDU "Okhtyrkanaftogaz." JSC "Naftoprommash." JSC "Okhtyrsilmash." JSC "Okhtyrsky garment factory." JSC "Okhtyrsky brewery." JSC "Bakery Akhtyrsky." Branch "Cheese Okhtyrsky" PE "Ros"

The current city mayor is Igor Alekseev.

Sports

Okhtyrka is home to the Ukrainian First League team FC Naftovyk-Ukrnafta Okhtyrka.

Notable people or residents born in Okhtyrka

Crimson, John P. - writer.
Batiuk, Nicholas Filippovich - Soviet military commander, one of the heroes of the defense of Stalingrad.
Borodaevsky, Sergey - economist.
Mikhail Gurevich. - Soviet aircraft designer, studied at the gymnasium Okhtyrka.
Ledenyov, Peter - Hero of the Soviet Union.
Rudinsky, Mikhail Yakovlevich - archaeologist.
Yaroslavsky, Peter Antonovich - architect.
Andrei Chikatilo - one of the most famous Soviet serial killer, he studied at the Technical College of Communications Okhtyrka.
Mykola Zerov - Ukrainian literary critic, poet - a master's sonnets.
Mykola Khvyliovyi - Soviet Ukrainian writer.
Svetlana Svetlichnaya - Soviet and Russian theater and film actress, Honoured Artist of the RSFSR (1974).
Oleksiy Berest - a Soviet officer, a veteran of World War II.
Paul Grabowski - Ukrainian poet, translator, member of the revolutionary movement.
Ostap Vyshnia - Soviet Ukrainian writer, humorist and satirist.
Borys Antonenko-Davydovych - Soviet and Ukrainian writer.
 Leonid Pavlovych Maidan - Ukrainian/Russian/Canadian poet. Editor of Ukrainian-language journal in Toronto (Canada) circa 1950. Also wrote under the pseudonym 'Dan-May' and 'Leonid May'. Books of poetry published in Canada include 'V Pokhid' (Ukrainian), and 'Stikhi-Lirika' Academia Press, 1949, (Russian). He is formally recognized as a Russian emigre poet by the Russian Federation.
 Tatiana Sheyko - Ukrainian Artist and Published Author. Has several works of art displayed at the Teddy Bear Art Museum in Billund, Denmark, along with her artwork toured in Collections across Europe and North America.

References

External links
  City portal
  Map of Okhtyrka
 Okhtyrka at the Association of Cities of Ukraine

 
Cities in Sumy Oblast
Akhtyrsky Uyezd
Cities of regional significance in Ukraine
1641 establishments in the Polish–Lithuanian Commonwealth
Populated places established in 1641
Cities and towns built in the Sloboda Ukraine